Environmental killings are murders, assassinations, or other unlawful killings which are linked to environmental issues such as illegal logging, mining, land grabbing, pollution etc. Victims have included not only environmental and land rights activists, but also members of indigenous communities and journalists who have reported on these issues.

Statements 

In 2003, the Environmental Justice Foundation reported that in at least 11 countries people had been murdered for opposing shrimp farming and its associated environmental impacts.

According to Global Witness, the number of environmental killings worldwide reached 147 in 2012, and the total number of such murders between 2002 and 2013 exceeds 908. In only six of these cases were the killers tried, convicted and punished. The report blames this level of impunity, together with the lack of attention to the issue, for the rise in the numbers of deaths.

In March 2014, when the United Nations Independent Expert on human rights and the environment, John Knox, presented his first detailed report to the UN Human Rights Council on the human rights obligations relating to environmental protection he stated: “Environmental human rights defenders deserve no less protection than other human rights defenders.”

List of killings 
Following is a list of the victims of environmental killings by date:

20th century

21st century 
In 21st century, more than 1000 environmental activists have been killed. Every year, more than 100 environmental activists are murdered throughout the world. 116 environmental activists were assassinated in 2014. More than two environmentalists were assassinated every week in 2014 and three every week in 2015. 185 environmental activists were assassinated in 2015. More than 200 environmental activists were assassinated worldwide between 2016 and 2018. In 2019 and 2020 the number was 212 and 227 respectively.

See also 

 Anti-environmentalism
 Green criminology
 Environmental activist killings in Honduras
 Environmental crime
 Environmental issues in Thailand#Murder of environmental activists
 Environmentalism
 Environmental activist
 Environmental degradation
 Goldman Environmental Prize
 Illegal logging
 Pollution

References

Extrajudicial killings